Adder Technology is a manufacturer of information technology hardware based in Cambridge, England, UK. It is the largest producer of keyboard, video, mouse (KVM) controllers in Europe.

History 

The company began in 1984 as Adder Publishing and was rebranded as Adder Technology in 1986. It relocated to Bar Hill in 2012.

Overview 

Adder develop hardware-based, remote-management devices which are sold under the brand name 'Adder'.  Products include KVM switches (analog and Cat5), KVM over IP, digital signage products, remote office/branch office solutions, and out-of-band management solutions.

Adder Technology has won Deloitte Touche Tohmatsu's "Fast 50" designation in the Deloitte Fast 500 awards for 8 consecutive years. The company has received a Queen's Award for Enterprise.

The company has offices in the US, UK, Germany, the Netherlands and Singapore, and a global distribution network. Some 60% of its production is exported to Europe and the United States. It was founded in 1984 by Adrian Dickens.

References 

Computer companies of the United Kingdom
Computer peripheral companies
Companies based in Cambridge
Computer companies established in 1984